Jiří Hudec (31 August 1923 – 28 July 1996) was a Czech composer, conductor, arranger and organist.

Life
Hudec was born in Brno, Moravia, where he studied organ at the State Conservatory under F. Michálek. In addition, he studied composing with Vilém Petrželka and conducting with Antonín Balatka. From 1944 to 1946, he also studied the piano privately under Ludvík Kundera. Later, he continued his studies of conducting at the Janáček Academy of Musical Arts. From 1953 to 1972 he was a conductor of the Symphony Orchestra of the Czech broadcasting studio Brno (BERO). From 1971 he worked as a radio director of chamber and symphonic music in Brno.

His great achievement was the promotion of the repertoire of Moravian and Slovak composers in radio broadcasts. He composed music for 15 films, and over 150 compositions for radio orchestras. The majority of his works are orchestral, but also many for concert band. His compositions are often based on folklore and songs from the Moravian region.

Hudec's eponymous son is a well-known double bass player, professor at the Prague Academy for Music, member of the Czech Philharmonic Orchestra and a Fellow of the Royal Northern College of Music.

Selected compositions
Orchestral
 Drei Stilisierte Polkas im Volkston (1969)
 Ricochet-Polka. Lustige Polka (1969)
 Poetická polka (Poetic Polka) (1970)
 Malé finale (Little Finale) (1972)
 Quasi gallop (1973)
 Kaleidoskop, Overture (1979)
 Zpod Javoriny, Dance Fantasy on Moravian Themes from Kopanice (1980)
 Humoreska (1981)
 České tance (Czech Dances), Suite (1983)
 Polka in G minor
 Koncertní valčík (Concert Waltz) (1986)
 Podzimní Meditace (Autumn Meditation) (1986)
 Tempo-tempo, Galop (1986)
 Scherzo in E (1988)
 Příhoda z léta (It Happened in Summer), Tone Picture (1989)
 Obrázky z dovolené (Pictures from Vacation), Suite for chamber orchestra
 Der Zerrspiegel

Wind orchestra
 Fox, Polka for 4 clarinets and wind orchestra (1971)
 Dupák, Czech Dance (1973)
 Pestrá paleta (A Wide Variety), Overture (1973)
 Lyrické intermezzo (Lyrical Intermezzo) (1982)
 Česká předehra (Czech Overture)
 Drei Schnapsgläser
 Moravské intermezzo (Moravian Intermezzo)

Concertante
 Triangolo: Polka-Groteske for triangle and orchestra (1969)
 Uspávanka pro Martinku (Lullaby for Martinek) for viola and orchestra (1980)
 Burleska for double bass and orchestra (1981)
 Ein Verliebter Timpanist: Polka-Groteske for timpani and orchestra

Chamber music
 4 Duettini for oboe (or trumpet) and bassoon (or trombone) (1988)
 4 Miniatures for wind trio
 Rapsodia per Quattro for 3 clarinets and bass clarinet (or bassoon)

References

External links
 Czech Music Fund: List of works

1923 births
1996 deaths
Czech classical composers
Czech male classical composers
Czech conductors (music)
Male conductors (music)
Czech classical organists
Male classical organists
20th-century classical composers
Musicians from Brno
Janáček Academy of Music and Performing Arts alumni
Czech film score composers
Male film score composers
20th-century conductors (music)
20th-century organists
20th-century Czech male musicians